The A72 road is a major route in Scotland connecting Hamilton in South Lanarkshire, with Galashiels in the Scottish Borders.

Route

Hamilton to Lanark
Starting at the junction with the A724, the road parallels the M74, following the original A74 (now B7078) before descending into the forested Clyde Valley as it skirts around the town of Larkhall. The road follows the River Clyde, with some tight bends, sheer drops and adverse cambers, and meets the A73 just north of Lanark.

Lanark to Causewayend 
This section of the road follows the course of the A73 through the town of Lanark and, just before Symington, again becomes the A72. It meets the main A702, Edinburgh to Abington, South Lanarkshire road; this short section of road is narrow as it passes through Symington.

Causewayend to Kaimrig End 

This section of the road follows the course of the A702 for approximately 3 miles through the town of Biggar. The A72 enters the village of Skirling before ascending onto higher moorland. This section of road is notorious for accidents due to its high elevation, poor weather and winding route.

Kaimrig End to Galashiels 
On this last  section of A72, it is the secondary route on the A701. Just south of Blyth Bridge, it meets the A721, and less than a mile further, it leaves the course of the A701. The A72 ascends a high plateau, then descends into the valley of the River Tweed at Stobo, and parallels the Tweed for the remainder of its length.

The road passes through Peebles and then Innerleithen and Walkerburn towards Galashiels.  It comes to an end at a junction with the A7, which leads on to the Galashiels Ring Road.

References 

Roads in Scotland
Transport in South Lanarkshire
Transport in the Scottish Borders
Hamilton, South Lanarkshire
Larkhall
Lanark
Peebles
Innerleithen
Galashiels